Cord William Sandberg (born January 2, 1995) is a former American football wide receiver. He previously played Minor League Baseball in the Philadelphia Phillies organization.

Early years
Sandberg played on the varsity baseball team at Manatee High School for four years, and participated in the 2012 Perfect Game USA, one of the most selective baseball recruiting organizations for high schoolers. Sandberg was also a football star, and was a dual threat quarterback for his entire high school career. He committed to attend Mississippi State University on a scholarship to play college football for the Mississippi State Bulldogs, but was expected to be a high draft pick in the 2013 MLB Draft.

Baseball career
The Philadelphia Phillies selected Sandberg with the 89th pick in the third round of the 2013 Major League Baseball Draft. He signed and spent 2013 with the GCL Phillies where he batted .207 with two home runs and 14 RBIs in 48 games. He spent 2014 with the Williamsport Crosscutters where he slashed .235/.267/345 with six home runs and 24 RBIs in 66 games, 2015 with the Lakewood BlueClaws where he compiled a .255 batting average with five home runs and 59 RBIs in 129 games, and 2016 with the Clearwater Threshers where he posted a .230 batting average with four home runs and 23 RBIs in 94 games. In 2017, Sandberg played for Lakewood, Clearwater, and the Reading Fightin Phils where he batted a combined .268 with nine home runs and 42 RBIs in 105 total games between the three teams.

Sandberg's father, Chuck, is a former baseball player for the University of Florida and the Boston Red Sox organization.

Football career 
Sandberg committed to the Auburn Tigers July 30, 2018 to play quarterback.

References

External links

Auburn Tigers bio
 	

1995 births
Living people
Sportspeople from Bradenton, Florida
Baseball players from Florida
Players of American football from Florida
Baseball outfielders
American football quarterbacks
Auburn Tigers football players
Florida Complex League Phillies players
Williamsport Crosscutters players
Lakewood BlueClaws players
Canberra Cavalry players
Clearwater Threshers players
Reading Fightin Phils players
American expatriate baseball players in Australia